The 24th PMPC Star Awards for TV ceremony was held at the Newport Performing Arts Theater, Resorts World Manila in Pasay on November 13, 2010 and broadcast over ABS-CBN Channel 2 on November 20, 2010. The ceremony was hosted by Angel Aquino, Ruffa Gutierrez and Miriam Quiambao.

Awards and Nominees
These are the nominations for the 24th Star Awards for Television. The winners are in bold.

Best TV station 
ABS-CBN-2
NBN-4
TV5
GMA-7
RPN-9
Q-11
IBC-13
Studio 23
Net 25
UNTV-37

Best Primetime TV Series 
Agua Bendita (ABS-CBN 2)
Dahil May Isang Ikaw (ABS-CBN 2)
Habang May Buhay (ABS-CBN 2)
Ikaw Sana (GMA 7)
Kung Tayo'y Magkakalayo (ABS-CBN 2)
Tanging Yaman (ABS-CBN 2)

Best Daytime Drama Series 
Kambal sa Uma (ABS-CBN 2)
Kung Aagawin Mo Ang Lahat Sa Akin (GMA 7)
Magkano Ang Iyong Dangal? (ABS-CBN 2)
Nagsimula sa Puso (ABS-CBN 2)
Precious Hearts Romances Presents: Impostor (ABS-CBN 2)
Rosalka (ABS-CBN 2)

Best Drama Mini-Series 
Precious Hearts Romances Presents:
Love Me Again (ABS-CBN 2)
SRO Cinemaserye: Exchange Gift (GMA 7)
SRO Cinemaserye: The Eva Castillo Story (GMA 7)
Your Song: Gaano Kita Kamahal (ABS-CBN 2)
Your Song: Love Me, Love You (ABS-CBN 2)

Best Drama Actor 
Gerald Anderson (Your Song: Isla / ABS-CBN 2)
Dingdong Dantes (Stairway to Heaven / GMA 7)
John Estrada (Dahil May Isang Ikaw / ABS-CBN 2)
Sid Lucero (Dahil May Isang Ikaw / ABS-CBN 2)
Coco Martin (Kung Tayo’y Magkakalayo / ABS-CBN 2)
Piolo Pascual (Lovers in Paris / ABS-CBN 2)
Jericho Rosales (Dahil May Isang Ikaw / ABS-CBN 2)

Best Drama Actress 
Kim Chiu (Kung Tayo’y Magkakalayo / ABS-CBN 2)
Chin Chin Gutierrez (Dahil May Isang Ikaw / ABS-CBN 2)
Angelica Panganiban (Rubi / ABS-CBN 2)
Cherry Pie Picache (Sineserye Presents: Florinda / ABS-CBN 2)
Susan Roces (Sana Ngayong Pasko / GMA 7)
Maricel Soriano (Sineserye Presents: Florinda / ABS-CBN 2)
Judy Ann Santos (Habang May Buhay / ABS-CBN 2)
Lorna Tolentino (Dahil May Isang Ikaw / ABS-CBN 2)

Best Drama Anthology 
5 Star Specials (TV5)
Maalaala Mo Kaya (ABS-CBN 2)
Maynila (GMA 7)

Best Single Performance by an Actress 
Irma Adlawan (Maalaala Mo Kaya: Sulo / ABS-CBN 2)
Gina Alajar (Maalaala Mo Kaya: Car / ABS-CBN 2)
Gretchen Barretto (Maalaala Mo Kaya: Larawan / ABS-CBN 2)
Angel Locsin (Maalaala Mo Kaya: Litrato / ABS-CBN 2)
Aiza Seguerra (Maalaala Mo Kaya: Kuwintas / ABS-CBN 2)
Maricel Soriano (5 Star Special Presents / TV5)
Dawn Zulueta (Maalaala Mo Kaya: Tsinelas / ABS-CBN 2)

Best Single Performance by an Actor 
Gerald Anderson (Maalaala Mo Kaya: Lubid / ABS-CBN 2)
Martin del Rosario (Maalaala Mo Kaya: Headband / ABS-CBN 2)
Lester Llansang (Maalaala Mo Kaya: Musiko / ABS-CBN 2)
Zanjoe Marudo (Maalaala Mo Kaya: Bag / ABS-CBN 2)
Dominic Ochoa (Maalaala Mo Kaya: Kuwintas / ABS-CBN 2)
Jolo Revilla (Maalaala Mo Kaya: Gitara / ABS-CBN 2)
Ronaldo Valdez (Maalaala Mo Kaya: Bisikleta / ABS-CBN 2)

Best New Male TV Personality 
Hermes Bautista (Your Song: Isla / ABS-CBN 2)
CJ Caparas (Kroko / IBC 13)
Paul Jake Castillo (Your Song: Isla / ABS-CBN 2)
Jason Francisco (Melason In Love / ABS-CBN 2)
Elmo Magalona (Party Pilipinas / GMA 7)
Tom Rodriguez (Your Song: Isla / ABS-CBN 2)
Johan Santos (Precious Hearts Romances Presents: Love Me Again / ABS-CBN 2)
Julian Trono (Panday Kids / GMA 7)

Best New Female TV Personality 
Carla Abellana (Rosalinda / GMA 7)
Alynna Asistio (Lokomoko U / TV5)
Melai Cantiveros (Melason In Love / ABS-CBN 2)
Sabrina Man (Panday Kids / GMA 7)
Xyriel Manabat (Agua Bendita / ABS-CBN 2) 
Cathy Remperas (Precious Hearts Romances: Love Me Again / ABS-CBN 2)
Princess Velasco (ASAP XV / ABS-CBN 2)
Frencheska Farr (Party Pilipinas / GMA7)

Best Gag Show 
Banana Split (ABS-CBN 2)
Bubble Gang (GMA 7)
Goin' Bulilit (ABS-CBN 2)
Laff En Roll (GMA 7)
Wow Mali (TV5)

Best Comedy Show 
Everybody Hapi (TV5)
George and Cecil (ABS-CBN 2)
My Darling Aswang (TV5)
Pepito Manaloto (GMA 7)
Show Me Da Manny (GMA 7)

Best Comedy Actor 
Ogie Alcasid (Bubble Gang / GMA 7)
Jayson Gainza (Banana Split / ABS-CBN 2)
Pooh (Banana Split / ABS-CBN 2)
Vic Sotto (My Darling Aswang / TV5)
Michael V. (Bubble Gang / GMA 7)

Best Comedy Actress 
Angelica Panganiban (Banana Split / ABS-CBN 2)
Pokwang (Banana Split / ABS-CBN 2)
Rufa Mae Quinto (Bubble Gang / GMA 7)
Judy Ann Santos (George & Cecil / ABS-CBN 2)
Nova Villa (Everybody Hapi / TV5)

Best Musical Variety Show 
ASAP XV (ABS-CBN 2)
Party Pilipinas (GMA 7)
Sharon (ABS-CBN 2)
Walang Tulugan with the Master Showman (GMA 7)

Best Female TV Host 
Sarah Geronimo (ASAP XV / ABS-CBN 2)
Toni Gonzaga (ASAP XV / ABS-CBN 2)
Pia Guanio (Eat Bulaga / GMA 7)
Pokwang (Wowowee / ABS-CBN 2)
Lucy Torres (P.O.5 / TV5) 
Regine Velasquez (SOP Rules / GMA 7)

Best Male TV Host 
Ogie Alcasid (SOP Rules / GMA 7)
Allan K. (Eat Bulaga / GMA 7)
Joey De Leon (Eat Bulaga / GMA 7)
Luis Manzano (ASAP XV / ABS-CBN 2)
Martin Nievera (ASAP XV / ABS-CBN 2)
Piolo Pascual (ASAP XV / ABS-CBN 2)
Vic Sotto (Eat Bulaga / GMA 7)

Best Public Service Program 
Bitag (UNTV 37)
Imbestigador (GMA 7)
Reunions (Q 11)
Wish Ko Lang (GMA 7)
XXX: Exklusibong, Explosibong, Exposé (ABS-CBN 2)

Best Public Service Program Host 
Julius Babao, Henry Omaga-Diaz, and Pinky Webb (XXX: Exklusibong, Explosibong, Exposé / ABS-CBN 2)
Mike Enriquez (Imbestigador / GMA 7)
Vicky Morales (Wish Ko Lang / GMA 7)
Jessica Soho (Reunions / Q 11)
Ben Tulfo (Bitag  / UNTV 37)

Best Horror-Fantasy Program 
Agimat Presents: Elias Paniki (ABS-CBN 2)
Agimat Presents: Pepeng Agimat (ABS-CBN 2)
Agimat Presents: Tiagong Akyat (ABS-CBN 2)
Agimat Presents: Tonyong Bayawak (ABS-CBN 2)
Midnight DJ (TV5)

Best Reality Program 
Day Off (Q 11)
Pinoy Records (GMA 7)
Totoo TV (TV5)

Best Reality Program Host 
Toni Gonzaga (Pinoy Big Brother: Double Up / ABS-CBN 2)
Mike Nacua and Carmina Villaroel (Day Off / Q 11)
Manny Pacquiao and Chris Tiu (Pinoy Records / GMA 7)
Maverick Relova and Ariel Villasanta (Totoo TV / TV5)
Mariel Rodriguez (Pinoy Big Brother: Double Up Uber / ABS-CBN 2)

Best Variety/Game Show 
Cool Center (GMA 7)
Kitchen Battles (Q 11)
Pilipinas, Game KNB? (ABS-CBN 2)
P.O.5 (TV5) 
Wowowee (ABS-CBN 2)

Best Game Show Host 
Ogie Alcasid and Michael V. (Hole in the Wall / GMA 7)
Bianca Gonzales (Pinoy Big Brother: Double Up Uplate / ABS-CBN 2)
Richard Gomez (Family Feud / GMA 7)
Edu Manzano (Pilipinas, Game KNB? / ABS-CBN 2)
Vic Sotto (Who Wants to Be a Millionaire / TV5)

Best Talent Search Program 
Are You the Next Big Star? (GMA)
Shall We Dance: The Celebrity Dance Challenge (TV5)
Showtime (ABS-CBN 2)
StarStruck V (GMA 7)
Talentadong Pinoy (TV5)

Best Talent Search Program Host 
Ryan Agoncillo (Talentadong Pinoy / TV5)
Ogie Alcasid and Regine Velasquez (Celebrity Duets Season 2 / GMA 7) 
Kim Atienza, Anne Curtis, Vhong Navarro and Vice Ganda (Showtime / ABS-CBN 2)
Billy Crawford and Luis Manzano (Pilipinas Got Talent / ABS-CBN 2)
Lucy Torres-Gomez (Shall We Dance: The Celebrity Dance Challenge / TV5)

Best Youth Oriented Program 
Ka-Blog! (GMA 7)
Lipgloss (TV5)

Best Educational Program 
Born to Be Wild (GMA 7)
Convergence (Net 25)
Matanglawin (ABS-CBN 2)
Math-Tinik (ABS-CBN 2)
Quickfire (Q 11)

Best Educational Program Host 
Kim Atienza (Matanglawin / ABS-CBN 2)
RJ Ledesma (Mathinik / ABS-CBN 2)
Ferds Recio and Kiko Rustia (Born to Be Wild / GMA 7)
Bong Revilla (Kap's Amazing Stories / GMA 7)
Chris Tiu (Ripley's Believe It Or Not / GMA 7)

Best Celebrity Talk Show 
Full Time Moms (Q 11)
Jojo A. All The Way (TV5)
Spoon (Net 25)
The Sweet Life (Q 11)
Tonight with Arnold Clavio (Q 11)

Best Celebrity Talk Show Host 
Arnold Clavio (Tonight with Arnold Clavio / Q 11)
Janice de Belen (Spoon / Net 25)
Janice de Belen, Gelli de Belen and Carmina Villaroel (Sis / GMA 7)
Wilma Doesnt and Lucy Torres-Gomez (The Sweet Life / Q 11)
Christine Jacob and Susan Entrata (Full Time Moms / Q 11)

Best Documentary Program 
The Correspondents (ABS-CBN 2)
Dokumentado (TV5)
I Survived (ABS-CBN 2)
I-Witness (GMA 7)
Reporter's Notebook (GMA 7)

Best Documentary Program Host 
Sandra Aguinaldo, Kara David, Howie Severino and Jay Taruc (I-Witness / GMA 7)
Paolo Bediones (USI: Under Special Investigation / TV5)
Karen Davila and Abner Mercado (The Correspondents / ABS-CBN 2)
Jiggy Manicad and Maki Pulido (Reporter's Notebook / GMA 7)
Ces Oreña-Drilon (I Survived / ABS-CBN 2)

Best Documentary Special 
Planet Philippines (GMA 7)
Vilma: Woman for All Seasons (ABS-CBN 2)

Best Magazine Show 
Kapuso Mo, Jessica Soho (GMA 7)
Mel and Joey (GMA 7)
Moments (Net 25)
Rated K (ABS-CBN 2)
Wonder Mom (ABS-CBN 2)

Best Magazine Show Host 
Karen Davila (Wonder Mom, ABS-CBN)
Joey de Leon and Mel Tiangco (Mel and Joey / GMA 7)
Gladys Reyes (Moments / Net 25)
Korina Sanchez (Rated K / ABS-CBN 2)
Jessica Soho (Kapuso Mo, Jessica Soho / GMA 7)

Best News Program 
24 Oras (GMA 7)
Bandila (ABS-CBN 2)
News Central (Studio 23)
News on Q (Q 11)
Saksi (GMA 7)
Teledyaryo (NBN 4)
TV Patrol World (ABS-CBN 2)

Best Male Newscaster 
Julius Babao (TV Patrol World / ABS-CBN 2)
Ted Failon (TV Patrol World / ABS-CBN 2)
Mike Enriquez (24 Oras / GMA 7)
Henry Omaga-Diaz (Bandila / ABS-CBN 2)
Daniel Razon (Ito Ang Balita / UNTV 37)
Alex Santos (TV Patrol Sabado / ABS-CBN 2)

Best Female Newscaster 
Karen Davila (TV Patrol World / ABS-CBN 2)
Angelique Lazo (Teledyaryo / NBN 4)
Vicky Morales (Saksi / GMA 7)
Ces Oreña-Drilon (Bandila / ABS-CBN 2)
Bernadette Sembrano (TV Patrol Sabado / ABS-CBN 2)
Mel Tiangco (24 Oras / GMA 7)

Best Morning Show 
Good Morning Kuya (UNTV 37)
Home Page (Net 25)
The Morning Show (NBN 4)
Umagang Kay Ganda (ABS-CBN 2)
Unang Hirit (GMA 7)

Best Morning Show Host 
Kim Atienza, Atom Araullo, Winnie Cordero, Ginger Conejero, Rica Peralejo, Donita Rose, Alex Santos, Bernadette Sembrano, Anthony Taberna and Pinky Webb (Umagang Kay Ganda / ABS-CBN 2)
Aljo Bendijo and Veronica Baluyut-Jimenez (The Morning Show / NBN 4)
Weng dela Fuente, Eunice Mariño and Onin Miranda (Home Page / Net 25)
Drew Arellano, Lyn Ching-Pascual, Arnold Clavio, Susie Entrata-Abrera, Lhar Santiago and Rhea Santos (Unang Hirit / GMA 7) 
Daniel Razon (Good Morning Kuya / UNTV 37)

Best Public Affairs Program 
The Bottomline with Boy Abunda (ABS-CBN 2)
Get It Straight with Daniel Razon (UNTV 37)
Probe Profiles (ABS-CBN 2)
Y Speak (Studio 23)

Best Public Affairs Program Host 
Boy Abunda (The Bottomline with Boy Abunda / ABS-CBN 2)
Bianca Gonzales (Y Speak / Studio 23)
Cheche Lazaro (Probe Profiles / ABS-CBN 2)
Daniel Razon (Get It Straight / UNTV 37)

Best Showbiz Oriented Talk Show 
The Buzz (ABS-CBN 2)
E-Live (ABS-CBN 2)
Juicy! (TV5)
Showbiz Central (GMA 7)
SNN: Showbiz News Ngayon (ABS-CBN 2)
Startalk (GMA 7)

Best Male Showbiz Oriented Talk Show Host 
Boy Abunda (SNN: Showbiz News Ngayon / ABS-CBN 2)
Joey de Leon (Startalk / GMA 7)
Raymond Gutierrez (Showbiz Central / GMA 7)
Luis Manzano (Entertainment Live / ABS-CBN 2)
Tim Yap (Tweetbiz, Q11)

Best Female Showbiz Oriented Talk Show Host 
Kris Aquino (The Buzz / ABS-CBN 2)
Cristy Fermin (Juicy, TV5)
Toni Gonzaga (Entertainment Live / ABS-CBN 2)
Bianca Gonzales (Entertainment Live / ABS-CBN 2)
Pia Guanio (Showbiz Central / GMA 7)

Best Children Show 
Art Angel (GMA 7)
Batang Bibbo (GMA 7)
Happy Land (GMA 7)
Kulilits (ABS-CBN 2)
Tropang Potchi (Q 11)

Best Children Show Host 
Love Añover and Patricia Gayod (Happy Land / GMA 7)
Pia Arcangel (Art Angel / GMA 7)
Roxanne Barcelo (Batang Bibbo / GMA 7)
Bugoy Cariño and Chacha Cañete (Kulilits / ABS-CBN 2)
Ella Cruz, Sabrina Man and Julian Trono (Tropang Potchi / Q 11)

Best Travel Show 
Balik-Bayan (Q 11)
Bread Tambayan (UNTV 37)
Biyaheng Langit (IBC 13)
Trip na Trip (ABS-CBN 2)

Best Travel Show Host 
Drew Arellano (Balik-Bayan / Q 11)
Katherine de Castro, Kian Kazemi and Uma Khouny (Trip na Trip / ABS-CBN 2)
Jack de Ocampo, Adam Maderal, Karen Santos, Madel Sulit and Manuel Tanaotanao (Bread N' Butter / UNTV 37)
Rey Langit (Biyaheng Langit / IBC 13)

Best Lifestyle Show 
Kay Susan Tayo (GMA 7)
Life and Style (Q 11)
Urban Zone (ABS-CBN 2)
Us Girls (Studio 23)
X-Life (Q 11)

Best Lifestyle Show Host 
Angel Aquino, Iya Villania and Cheska Garcia (Us Girls / Studio 23)
Gino dela Pena, Steph Henares and JC Tiuseco (X-Life / Q 11)
Susan Enriquez (Kay Susan Tayo/ GMA 7)
Daphne Oseña-Paez (Urban Zone / ABS-CBN 2)
Ricky Reyes (Life and Style / Q 11)

Special awards

Ading Fernando Lifetime Achievement Awardee 
Antonio Tuviera

Excellence in Broadcasting Awardee 
Che Che Lazaro

Celebrity Faces of the Night 
JC de Vera (Male)
Ruffa Gutierrez (Female)

Faces of the Night 
Kean Kazemi (Male)
Nikki Gil (Female)

Stars of the Night 
Luis Manzano (Male)
Miriam Quiambao (Female)

See also 
PMPC Star Awards for TV

References 

PMPC Star Awards for Television